Wila Kunka (Aymara wila blood, blood-red, kunka throat, "red throat", hispanicized spelling Velacunca) is a mountain in the Cusco Region in the Andes of Peru, about  high. It is situated in the Canchis Province, Checacupe District. Wila Kunka lies at the left bank of the Chawchamayu (Chauchamayo), northwest of Qusqu Qhawarina.

References

Mountains of Peru
Mountains of Cusco Region